

References

External links
 Official site

Primary schools in South Australia
Educational institutions established in 1952
1952 establishments in Australia